Weyto or Weyt'o can refer to
 hunter-gatherers in Ethiopia, including the Weyto caste of Lake Tana
 Weyto language, a language formerly spoken by the Lake Tana Weyto
 Weito River, a river in Ethiopia

Language and nationality disambiguation pages